The 1992–93 Icelandic Hockey League season was the second season of the Icelandic Hockey League, the top level of ice hockey in Iceland. Three teams participated in the league, and Skautafelag Akureyrar won the championship.

Standings

External links 
 1992-93 season

Icelandic Hockey League
Icelandic Hockey League seasons
1992–93 in Icelandic ice hockey